Peter John Lee (born 5 June 1947) is an Anglican clergyman, Bishop of the Diocese of Christ the King, Johannesburg, South Africa.

Educated at Gresham's School, Holt, Norfolk, The Hotchkiss School in Connecticut, and St. John's College, Cambridge, Lee was ordained in the Church of England and has worked in South Africa since 1976.

He worked with Archbishop Desmond Tutu as Canon Missioner of the Anglican diocese of Johannesburg before being elected as bishop of the new Diocese of Christ the King. Lee retired in Jun 2016, The electoral college whose job it was to elect a successor failed to do so.  The synod of bishops of the Anglican Church of Southern Africa will appoint a successor at their meeting in 2016.

Works

Honours 

 Lambeth degree of Bachelor of Divinity, 13 July 2006.

Notes and references 
 

 
 

1947 births
Living people
People educated at Gresham's School
Hotchkiss School alumni
Alumni of St John's College, Cambridge
Anglican bishops of Christ the King
21st-century Anglican Church of Southern Africa bishops